Wayllani (Aymara waylla Stipa obtusa, a kind of feather grass, -ni a suffix, "the one with the feather grass", also spelled Huayllani) is a  mountain in the Chilla-Kimsa Chata mountain range in the Andes of Bolivia. It is located in the La Paz Department, Ingavi Province, on the border of the municipalities of Jesús de Machaca and Viacha. It lies southeast of Turini.

References 

Mountains of La Paz Department (Bolivia)